Heinrich Weidemann (1899–1982) was a German art director.

Selected filmography
 The Gambler (1938)
 The Swedish Nightingale (1941)
 Ghost in the Castle (1947)
 The Trip to Marrakesh (1949)
 Scandal at the Embassy (1950)
 When Men Cheat (1950)
 The Dubarry (1951)
 Rose of the Mountain (1952)
 Mikosch Comes In (1952)
 Klettermaxe (1952)
 Mailman Mueller (1953)
 Hooray, It's a Boy! (1953)
 When The Village Music Plays on Sunday Nights (1953)
 Love is Forever (1954)
 The Gypsy Baron (1954)
 The Beautiful Miller (1954)
 The Faithful Hussar (1954)
 On the Reeperbahn at Half Past Midnight (1954)
 Emil and the Detectives (1954)
 The Country Schoolmaster (1954)
 The Ambassador's Wife (1955)
 When the Alpine Roses Bloom  (1955)
 Your Life Guards (1955)
 Sergeant Borck (1955)
 The Tour Guide of Lisbon (1956)
 My Brother Joshua (1956)
 As Long as the Roses Bloom (1956)
 Greetings and Kisses from Tegernsee (1957)
 All Roads Lead Home (1957)
 The Csardas King (1958)
 Abschied von den Wolken (1959)
 Peter Shoots Down the Bird (1959)
 One, Two, Three (1961)
 Freddy in the Wild West (1964)
 The Doctor Speaks Out (1966)

References

Bibliography
 Lowe, Barry. Atomic Blonde: The Films of Mamie Van Doren. McFarland, 2008.

External links

1899 births
1982 deaths
German art directors